The Vortex is a play in three acts by the English writer and actor Noël Coward. The play depicts the sexual vanity of a rich, ageing beauty, her troubled relationship with her adult son, and drug abuse in British society circles after the First World War. The son's cocaine habit is seen by many critics as a metaphor for homosexuality, then taboo in Britain. Despite, or because of, its scandalous content for the time, the play was Coward's first great commercial success.

The play premiered in November 1924 in London and played in three theatres until June 1925, followed by a British tour and a New York production in 1925–26. It has enjoyed several revivals and a film adaptation.

Background
 
In the years after the First World War, pairings in England of older, upper class women and younger men were common. The idea for the play was put in Coward's mind by an incident at a nightclub. Grace Forster, the elegant mother of his friend Stewart Forster, was talking to a young admirer, when a young woman said, in earshot of Coward and Forster, "Will you look at that old hag over there with the young man in tow; she's old enough to be his mother". Forster paid no attention, and Coward immediately went across and embraced Grace, as a silent rebuke to the young woman who had made the remark. The episode led him to consider how a "mother–young son–young lover triangle" might be the basis of a play.

To add to the dramatic effect of his play, Coward included a further source of conflict between the mother, Florence, and son, Nicky. Coward's friend and biographer Cole Lesley records, "this came easily to him from his unlikely pre-occupation … with the subject of drug addiction". To Nicky's explicit cocaine habit, the author added what many critics have seen as a gay sub-text. Coward's biographer Philip Hoare sees clues to Nicky's unconventional sexuality in his intimate friendship with John Bagot (an offstage character), and his implausible engagement to a brisk young woman, Bunty Mainwaring; Hoare describes her as "a 'beard', a guise of heterosexuality". When asked if she is pretty, Nicky answers, "I don't know – I haven't really noticed." Florence's lover Tom finds Nicky "effeminate". The literary critic John Lahr writes that Coward pushed at the prevailing moral boundaries of the day: "His straight-talking about homosexuality – the issue disguised as drug-taking in The Vortex and the code behind the frivolity in his great comedies – was as far as he could go."

Until 1968 the English theatre was subject to official censorship; plays had to be licensed by the Lord Chamberlain's Office. The Vortex barely survived the censor's scrutiny, but Coward pleaded his case in person to the Lord Chamberlain, Lord Cromer. He persuaded Cromer that the play was "a moral tract", and despite reservations expressed to the Chamberlain by King George V and others, Cromer granted a licence.

Leading London managements considered staging the piece, but some shied away from the scandalous content, and others did not want Coward to play the lead. As one of Coward's principal objects in writing the play had been "to write a good play with a whacking great part in it for myself", he abandoned attempts to convince West End managements, and arranged to stage the play at the Everyman Theatre, Hampstead, a fringe venue in north London. When the money for the production threatened to run out during rehearsals, Coward secured the necessary funding from his friend the author Michael Arlen.

As well as co-starring, Coward directed the play. Upset by a last-minute revision that increased Coward's role and, she believed, diminished the importance of hers, the female star, Kate Cutler, dropped out less than two weeks before the premiere. Coward was able to engage the veteran actress Lilian Braithwaite, who accepted the part for the small salary offered and learned it at very short notice.

Original production

The Vortex opened at the Everyman Theatre, Hampstead, North London on 25 November 1924, with the following cast:
Preston – Claire Keep
Helen Saville – Mary Robson
Pauncefort Quentin – F. Kinsey Peile
Clara Hibbert – Millie Sim
Florence Lancaster – Lilian Braithwaite
Tom Veryan – Alan Hollis
Nicky Lancaster – Noël Coward
David Lancaster – Bromley Davenport
Bunty Mainwaring – Molly Kerr
Bruce Fairlight – Ivor Barnard

The production was well received for its passionate acting and became a sensation because of its scandalous subject matter. The production moved to the West End at the Royalty Theatre on 16 December 1924 and transferred to the Comedy Theatre in February 1925 and finally to The Little Theatre, closing on 16 June 1925. On the few occasions when Coward was unable to play the part, his role was taken by his understudy, John Gielgud. The sets and costumes were designed by Coward's friend Gladys Calthrop. The play also toured the British provinces, and Cutler, as Florence, eventually joined the now-proven show's cast. As Coward noted in his memoir Present Indicative, "The Press notices ... were, on the whole, enthusiastic." The Daily Mirror called the play "an interesting and, in some respects, a remarkable comedy". The Manchester Guardian had some reservations, but described the play as "genuinely and deeply interesting". The Observer also had reservations but thought parts of the play "the best thing Mr. Coward has yet done in playwriting." The Times opined: "It is a study that has wit, observation, and a sincerity, leaping out between flippances, which is its peculiar merit." Hannen Swaffer, a reviewer who became Coward's most implacable critic over the years, called it "the most decadent play of our time".

Produced by Joseph P. Bickerton, Jr., The Vortex opened in Washington D.C. on 7 September 1925 and then on Broadway at the Henry Miller's Theatre on 16 September, closing in January 1926 after 157 performances. Coward and Basil Dean directed and the cast was:
Preston – George Harcourt
Helen Saville – Auriol Lee
Pauncefort Quentin – Leo G. Carroll
Clara Hibbert – Jeanette Sherwin
Florence Lancaster – Lilian Braithwaite
Tom Veryan – Alan Hollis
Nicky Lancaster – Noël Coward
David Lancaster – David Glassford
Bunty Mainwaring – Molly Kerr
Bruce Fairlight – Thomas Braidon.
This was followed by an American tour, in which Rose Hobart replaced Molly Kerr.

Synopsis
Act I
Nicky Lancaster is a talented and fashionable, but feckless, young composer and pianist in post-World War I England. He is engaged to Bunty Mainwaring, a journalist; his mother Florence, an ageing socialite beauty, has extramarital affairs with younger men in an attempt to recapture her youth. She does not disguise these, creating society gossip. Her friend Helen advises her to accept ageing more gracefully. Florence's new young man, Tom, turns out to be Bunty's ex-fiancé, which makes Nicky jealous. Florence plans a weekend social gathering at the family's country house.

Act II
On Sunday evening the house party is in full swing, with Nicky playing the piano. Florence feels insecure about Tom, and she and Nicky quarrel. Helen discovers Nicky's drug habit and pleads with him to give it up. Nicky struggles with the simmering resentment he feels for his vainglorious and promiscuous mother, his own weakness for cocaine, and, in the view of some commentators, his repressed homosexuality. Bunty breaks off her engagement with Nicky and seeks Tom's comfort. Florence catches them kissing.

Act III
The next morning Helen asks Florence to think of her son, but Florence is more concerned with blaming Tom and Bunty. Nicky arrives as Helen leaves, and he and Florence quarrel more. He reveals his drug habit to her and begs her to give up her selfish ways and to behave like a mother. In the end, the two each agree to try to change, as Florence strokes Nicky's hair.

Revivals and adaptations
A 1952 revival played at the Theatre Royal, Brighton and the Lyric Theatre, Hammersmith, with Dirk Bogarde as Nicky and Isabel Jeans as Florence. Also in the cast were Adrianne Allen (Helen), Robert Andrews (Quentin), Sylvia Coleridge (Clara), Nicholas Hannen (David) and Peter Jones (Bruce). The production transferred to the Criterion Theatre, London, for 44 performances, with Michael Gough taking over as Nicky. The play was revived in 1974 at the Greenwich Theatre, London, with Vivien Merchant and Timothy Dalton; in New York City off-Broadway at the Diane Von Furstenburg Studio, The Theater, in 2001; and at the Donmar Warehouse in London in 2002. In 2008 the play was performed at the Apollo Theatre, London, starring Felicity Kendal as Florence and Dan Stevens as Nicky. The play was presented in Singapore by the British Theatre Playhouse from 27 April to 15 May 2016, starring Jane Seymour as Florence.

A 1928 film version starred Willette Kershaw as Florence and Ivor Novello as Nicky. Radio adaptations have been broadcast by the BBC, first in 1939 with Athene Seyler as Florence and John Chestle as Nicky; in 1958, with Fay Compton and David Spenser; in 1967 starring Joan Greenwood and Richard Briers, and in 1975 starring Elizabeth Sellars and Martin Jarvis. The play has been adapted for television on several occasions. In 1960 a BBC version starred Ann Todd and David McCallum as Florence and Nicky. In an ITV adaptation in 1964 those roles were played by Margaret Johnston and Nicholas Pennell.; a 1969 BBC television version starred Margaret Leighton and Richard Warwick.

Critical reception
In 1961 Kenneth Tynan described The Vortex as "a jeremiad against narcotics with dialogue that sounds today not so much stilted as high-heeled". In 2002 Benedict Nightingale suggested that although Tynan's comment was not without some truth, The Vortex was proving durable: "The play that shocked the Establishment in 1924 is more likely to endure than the play that, with Tynan's avid encouragement, did ditto in 1956: Look Back in Anger. That's largely because many of the objects of John Osborne's ire … have disappeared into history. The Vortex dates less because it gives a twist to a timeless episode in Hamlet." In a review of Peter Hall's 2008 production Christopher Hart wrote in The Sunday Times that the climactic confrontation between Nicky and Florence is "suddenly, less brittle Coward than howling Strindberg, all revulsion and choking disgust at life in general and 'the utter foulness of growing old' in particular. These two damaged but hitherto seemingly trivial characters powerfully draw our empathy now, in all their weltering petulance, vanity and self-pity."

Notes, references and sources

Notes

References

Sources

External links
2002 review of The Vortex at the Donmar Warehouse
2001 review of The Vortex off-Broadway at Diane Von Furstenburg Studio, The Theater
Internet Broadway Database listing

Plays by Noël Coward
Theatre about drugs